Trzcianne  is a village in Mońki County, Podlaskie Voivodeship, in north-eastern Poland. It is the seat of the gmina (administrative district) called Gmina Trzcianne. It is close to Biebrza National Park. The village has a population of 610.

History
First records of Trzcianne come from the 13th century. The name probably comes from reeds surrounding the river that flowed through the village. According to the records of Aleksander Jagiellon, Grand Duke of Lithuania, the first Catholic church in Trzcianne was built before 1496. It survived for ca. 100 years. The current, fourth church in Trzcianne was built in 1846 and consecrated in 1860.

The vast majority of Trzcianne's population in the 20th century were Jewish.The first Jews arrived in Tzcianne in the 18th century. It was a shtetl, in the 1909 census, 98% of Trzcianne's population was Jewish.  There is still an old Jewish cemetery in the village, but it is not tended by anyone.

According to the 1921 census, the village was inhabited by 1.434 people, among whom 33 were Roman Catholic, 1.401 Mosaic. At the same time, 33 inhabitants declared Polish nationality, 1.401 Jewish. There were 177 residential buildings in the village.

When the Germans occupied the area in June 1941, they set fire to the whole village. Then, they gathered together more than 1000 local Jews in the neighboring village of Zubole. The Jews were kept in the gravel pit and then in a barn for almost a week before the series mass executions took place. 400 to 700 Jews were murdered. The rest of the Jews were released. In autumn of 1941, a ghetto was created in Trzcianne. It lasted until November 2, 1942, when the Jews from the ghetto were sent to the Bogusze transit camp. A few weeks later, with Jews from surrounding town and villages, they were sent to Treblinka and Auschwitz death camps. Right before the Second World War, there were about 2500 Jews living in the village, only 25 Trzcianne Jews survived the Holocaust.

Both during and after World War II, many inhabitants of Trzcianne were  deported to Kazakhstan by the Soviets.

Tourist attractions
Church dating to 1846
Jewish cemetery

References

External links
Trzcianne Gmina official site
Trzcianne Parish 
Photos of Trzcianne

Villages in Mońki County
Belostoksky Uyezd
Białystok Voivodeship (1919–1939)
Belastok Region
Shtetls
Holocaust locations in Poland